The 1949 Soviet Chess Championship was the 17th edition of USSR Chess Championship. Held from 16 October to 20 November 1949 in Moscow. The tournament was won by Vassily Smyslov and David Bronstein. Mikhail Botvinnik did not participate in the championship again, he was to take a three-year break, to work on his doctorate. Semifinals tournaments were played in the cities of Moscow, Leningrad, Tbilisi and Vilnius.

Table and results

References 

USSR Chess Championships
Championship
Chess
1949 in chess
Chess